The Inbetweeners is an American television sitcom developed by Brad Copeland for MTV. The show stars Joey Pollari, Bubba Lewis, Mark L. Young, Zack Pearlman, Alex Frnka and Brett Gelman. The show is a remake of the original UK series of the same name written and created by Damon Beesley and Iain Morris, who served as executive producers alongside Copeland, Aaron Kaplan and Lauren Corra. It ran on MTV from August 20, to November 5, 2012. On November 28, 2012, the series was canceled after one season, due to poor ratings and reviews.

Main cast
 Joey Pollari as Will McKenzie
 Bubba Lewis as Simon Cooper
 Alex Frnka as Carli D'Amato
 Zack Pearlman as Jay Cartwright
 Mark L. Young as Neil Sutherland

Production
After an unsuccessful attempt by ABC to create an American version of The Inbetweeners in 2008, MTV announced in late-September 2010 that it had hired noted comedy writer Brad Copeland (known for writing on American comedies such as Arrested Development and My Name Is Earl) to write the script for an American Inbetweeners series. Taika Waititi was chosen to direct the pilot.

On 31 March 2011, MTV officially announced that it had picked up The Inbetweeners for an additional eleven episodes, creating a twelve-episode first season. Copeland served as executive producer and showrunner.

In November 2012, MTV had decided not to go ahead with a planned second season of the American remake. MTV said to The Wrap, "While we won't be moving forward with another season of The Inbetweeners, we enjoyed working with the show's creators and such a talented, funny cast."

Episodes

Critical reception
The series was panned by critics. However, on Metacritic the series has a score of 62 out of 100 based on 9 reviews, indicating "generally favourable reviews". The American version is extremely unpopular with viewers from the UK, with many newspapers reporting that it had "flopped". It was listed by Metro as one of the "Top 10 British comedies whose US remakes have flopped".

Cancelled film adaptation
On July 3, 2012, it was announced that a U.S. adaptation of The Inbetweeners Movie was in the works. Morris and Beesley were approached by Paramount Pictures to lead the project. However, following the cancellation of the series, the film was never produced.

On August 22, 2013, Jim Field Smith was initially revealed to be directing the American adaptation of the British film, then titled Virgins America, but as of 2023, no further developments have taken place. Whether Morris and Beesley had any involvement with the project is unknown.

References

External links 

 
 Kiwi Taika Waititi directing The Inbetweeners US pilot

2012 American television series debuts
2012 American television series endings
2010s American high school television series
2010s American sex comedy television series
2010s American single-camera sitcoms
2010s American teen sitcoms
American television series based on British television series
English-language television shows
MTV original programming
Television series about teenagers
Television shows set in Florida
The Inbetweeners
Television series by Banijay
Television series by Kapital Entertainment